Ravi Jagannathan is an American economist. He is a chaired professor at the Kellogg School of Management at Northwestern University. With the exception of the period 1989–1997 when he was a professor at the University of Minnesota, Jagannathan has been at Kellogg since graduate school.

Jagannathan received a bachelor's degree in mechanical engineering from the College of Engineering, Guindy of University of Madras in 1970, an MBA from the Indian Institute of Management Ahmedabad, India  and his Ph.D. from Carnegie Mellon University.

His research interests are in the areas of asset pricing, capital markets and financial institutions. Along with Zhenyu Wang, in 1996 he advanced a variation on the capital asset pricing model known as "conditional CAPM."  Some recent empirical work on options prices supports this model.

He is also among those known for the Hansen-Jagannathan bounds which provide a way to use security market data to restrict the volatility of the stochastic discount factor.

References

External links
 Faculty Page, kellogg.northwestern.edu
 
 

1950s births
University of Minnesota faculty
Kellogg School of Management faculty
Indian emigrants to the United States
Living people
Financial economists
21st-century American economists
Tepper School of Business alumni
Indian Institute of Management Ahmedabad alumni
American academics of Indian descent
The Review of Financial Studies editors
Indian scholars